Caucasus Cavalry Division can refer to:

Caucasus Cavalry Division (Russian Empire)
Caucasian Native Cavalry Division